The following lists events that happened during 1991 in Zaire.

Incumbents 
 President: Mobutu Sese Seko
 Prime Minister: Lunda Bululu – Mulumba Lukoji – Étienne Tshisekedi – Bernardin Mungul Diaka – Jean Nguza Karl-i-Bond

Events

See also

 Zaire
 History of the Democratic Republic of the Congo

References

Sources

 
Zaire
Zaire